The  is a water bus operator in Tokyo. Unlike Tokyo Metropolitan Park Association (Tokyo Mizube Line), another water bus operator in Tokyo, Tokyo Cruise Ship is a privately owned company operating public transport.  The services include public lines listed below, as well as event cruises and chartered ships.

Lines
Arrows (→) indicate ships only go that direction. Dashes (—) indicate ships go both directions. Lines are operated everyday, unless noted otherwise.

■ 
Asakusa → Hamarikyū → Hinode Pier
Hinode Pier → Asakusa
■ 
Asakusa → Odaiba Seaside Park → Toyosu → Asakusa
■ 
Odaiba Seaside Park → (Cruising) → Odaiba Seaside Park
A daily event cruise for dog people.
■ 
Hinode Pier — Harumi — Odaiba Seaside Park
■ 
Hinode Pier — Tokyo Big Sight — Palette Town
Closes on Monday and Tuesday.
■ 
Hinode Pier — Museum of Maritime Science — Ooi Seashore Park — Shinagawa Aquarium
Closes when Shinagawa Aquarium closes (basically on Tuesday). The line is called  inside ships.

Ships

Second sister ship to Himiko

The design produced by Leiji Matsumoto, world-famous Anime and Manga artist.

Sister ship to Himiko

Sumida-I (Sumida-Wan)
A rescue work ship.

Used for the Happy Dog Cruise. The only paddlewheeler in Tokyo Bay.

Stations

See also
Tokyo Mizube Line
The Port Service
Keihin Ferry Boat
Water taxi

External links
 Official website

Ferry companies of Japan
Water transport in Tokyo
Water taxis